In theoretical physics, a source field is a field  whose multiple

appears in the action, multiplied by the original field . When the field  is the electromagnetic potential or the metric tensor, the source field is the electric current or the stress–energy tensor, respectively.

All Green's functions (correlators) may be formally found via Taylor expansion of the partition sum considered as a function of the source fields.  This method is commonly used in the path integral formulation of quantum field theory.  The general method by which such source fields can be utilized to obtain propagators in both quantum, statistical-mechanics and other systems is outlined in the article on the partition function.

Quantum field theory